Plasmodium capistrani is a parasite of the genus Plasmodium.

Like all Plasmodium species P. capistrani has both vertebrate and insect hosts. The vertebrate hosts for this parasite are birds.

Description 

The parasite was first described by Russell in 1932.

Geographical occurrence 

This species is found in the Philippines.

Clinical features and host pathology 

The hosts for this parasite include the painted quail Excalfactoria lineata.

References 

capistrani